Art of the Duo may refer to the following:
Art of the Duo (Mal Waldron and Jim Pepper album) (Tutu, 1988)
Art of the Duo (Lee Konitz and Albert Mangelsdorff album) (Enja, 1988)
Art of the Duo (Philip Catherine and Niels-Henning Ørsted Pedersen album) (Enja, 1993)